The 1st Hussar Regiment of the Lithuanian Grand Hetman Duke Jonušas Radvila, also known as the 1st Cavalry Regiment was a hussar regiment that served in the Lithuanian Army during the Interwar period.

Formation 
In the autumn of 1918, the first Lithuanian military units, including cavalry squadrons, began to be formed for the struggle for Lithuania's independence. The 1st Hussar Squadron was established in Kaunas on 9 January 1919. Officer J. Kasiulis was as the 1st Squadron's commander. On 4 February 1919, the formation of the 2nd Hussar Squadron began. Officer Aleksandras Laikūnas was appointed as its commander. On April 1, a gendarme squad of 40 selected soldiers was formed from both squadrons to maintain order in Kaunas' garrison. In early 1919, a 20-strong Hussar group was guarding the French Military Mission in Kaunas.

Lithuanian Wars of independence 
In 1919-1920, the 1st Cavalry Regiment fought against the Red Army, Bermontians and units of the Polish Army. 

The first battles with the Bolsheviks showed that the Lithuanian army required more cavalry. So, the Commander-in-Chief of the Armed Forces, General Silvestras Žukauskas issued an order on 12 May 1919 that all mounted units be formed into the 1st Lithuanian Horsemen Regiment. Major G. E. Hoeger of the Swedish Armed Forces was made its commander. Since July 1, the regiment was taken over by Officer , who also started forming the 3rd Squadron.

On 10 November 1919, the regiment was named the 1st Horsemen Regiment. As the situation on the fronts deteriorated, a 4th Squadron (commander J. Kalino, an officer of Lithuanian Tartar origin) was formed.

Five hussars of this regiment died during combat in 1919-1923. Six officers and 48 soldiers of the regiment were awarded the Order of the Cross of Vytis for excellence in combat.

Interwar 
On 1 August 1921, it was renamed as the 1st Cavalry Regiment. 

On 1 April 1922, the regiment was renamed as 1st Hussar Regiment.

On 25 September 1927, the regiment's feastday, the regiment was renamed to 1st Hussar Regiment of the Lithuanian Grand Hetman Duke Jonušas Radvila and the regiment was presented with a flag with the motto "" (We will defeat [the enemy] or we will die). The regiment was given the privilege of the monogram JR with a ducal crown, which were written on the epaulettes of the soldiers' uniforms.

In September 1939, the regiment had the following squadrons: four regular, one each for heavy machine guns, training, economy. In addition, there were the anti-aircraft and anti-tank gun groups, and an armored squad. In peacetime, the regiment was stationed in the Žaliakalnis barracks in Kaunas.

Soviet occupation and disbandment 
After the USSR occupied Lithuania, on 25 July 1940 it was renamed the 1st Hussar Regiment. The regiment was disbanded on 30 August 1940.

Regimental commanders 

 1919 – Major G. E. Hoegeris
 1919 – Colonel 
 Colonel Jonas Litvinas
 Major T. Engmanas
 Officer Šileris
 1920-1929 – Povilas Plechavičius
 General Staff Lieutenant colonel J. Bačkus
 1935-1939 – General Staff Colonel 
 1939-1940 – General Staff Colonel 
 1940 – Colonel

Uniforms
In 1931, the hussars were the first in the Lithuanian army to have used Jonušas Radvila's monogram "JR" with a ducal crown as a distinctive sign on their epaulettes. The "JR" was in massive white metal letters. The soldiers' hats were red. The uniform was grey-green, the collars were triangular and white with Columns of Gediminas. The cuffs and sleeve cuffs were white, the trousers - red, in a hussar fashion, with white cuffs, boots had rosettes at the boot's top.

References

Sources 

 

Military units and formations established in 1919
Military units and formations disestablished in 1940
Cavalry regiments of Lithuania